Elaine Macmann "Mac" Willoughby (March 22, 1926 – November 12, 2012) was an American educator and writer of children's books.

Life
Elaine Maybelle Macmann, known as "Mac", was born in Lexington, Massachusetts, and was the only child of Walter and Mabel Macmann. She received a B.S. of Education from Wheelock College, graduating in 1949 as vice-president of her class. In the summer of 1951 she also attended the University of Rhode Island, and in the summer of 1953 attended the Breadloaf School of English at Middlebury College. She received her MA and PhD in Education from the Teachers College, Columbia University, from 1954 to 1957.

Her teaching career began with primary school where she taught 1st grade in Norwood, Massachusetts, from 1949–1951, in Arlington, Virginia, from 1951–1952, and Wilmington, Delaware, from 1952–1953. She also taught at the Agnes Russel Center of the Teachers College while pursuing her MA and PhD. After graduating from Columbia she pursued teaching opportunities at the college level where she taught Language Arts, Children's Literature, and Child Development at Bowling Green State University, Kent State University, the University of New Hampshire, Oberlin College, and Baldwin-Wallace College.

She married the flutist Robert Hugh Willoughby in the summer of 1957, after having dated him off and on for several years. They moved to Oberlin, Ohio, where he was teaching at Oberlin College. In 1960 they spent a year in Cincinnati, where their son John was born. In 1987 they moved to New Castle, New Hampshire, which was the setting for several of her books.

She actively supported a variety of charities, from the schools she attended  to local charities. To help raise funds and awareness for the Strawberry Banke Museum, she wrote "The Story of Strawberry Banke" in 1981 that sold at the museum gift shop with all profits going to the museum.

Elaine Willoughby died of a cerebral stroke on November 12, 2012, in Portsmouth, New Hampshire, and is buried in New Castle, New Hampshire.

Writing career
Her children's books were widely reviewed and well received.  For example, her 1980  title, Boris and the Monstors appeared in a 1980 article in USA Today about favorite books to read aloud at bedtime, and Risky Business appeared in a  Chicago Tribune  list of the best books of 1956. Two of her books, Mystery of the Island Fires and Mystery of the Lobster Thieves were selected and printed by Weekly Reader for their Children's Book Club editions.

Selected works

References

External links

 Elaine MacMann Willoughby

1926 births
2012 deaths
American women children's writers
American children's writers
20th-century American writers
20th-century American women writers
People from Lexington, Massachusetts
Writers from Massachusetts
Writers from New Hampshire
Wheelock College alumni
Teachers College, Columbia University alumni
Bowling Green State University faculty
Kent State University faculty
University of New Hampshire faculty
Oberlin College faculty
Baldwin Wallace University faculty
Educators from Massachusetts
Educators from New Hampshire
American women academics
21st-century American women